The second series of Geordie Shore, a British television programme based in Newcastle upon Tyne, began airing on 31 January 2012 on MTV. The series concluded on 3 April 2012 after 8 episodes and 2 specials including a reunion show presented by Russell Kane and an episode counting down the best bits of the series. This was the first series to feature Rebecca Walker and Ricci Guarnaccio. The series featured Sophie and Joel's rocky relationship coming to an end, Vicky being torn between her boyfriend Dan and new cast member Ricci, Charlotte admitting she's finally had enough of seeing Gaz with other girls, and the beginning of Holly and James.

Cast
 Gaz Beadle
Charlotte-Letitia Crosby
 Holly Hagan
James Tindale
Jay Gardner
Vicky Pattison
Sophie Kasaei
Ricci Guarnaccico
 Rebecca Walker

Duration of Cast

 = Cast member is featured in this episode.
 = Cast member arrives in the house.
 = Cast member voluntarily leaves the house.
 = Cast member is removed from the house.
 = Cast member returns to the house.
 = Cast member does not feature in this episode.

Episodes

Ratings

References

2012 British television seasons
Series 02